Betsy Devine (born 1946) is an American author, journalist, and blogger, with published works including Longing for the Harmonies (1988), an appreciation of modern physics with Nobel laureate Frank Wilczek, and of Absolute Zero Gravity (1993), a collection of light-hearted material about science, with biologist Joel E. Cohen. She is a Wikipedian and spoke at Wikimania in 2006.

Biography
Devine earned a master's degree in engineering from Princeton University.

Devine has had, according to her self-description, "many years of immersion in geek sociology, including both Slashdot and Wikipedia flame wars". She is co-author, with husband Frank Wilczek, of Longing for the Harmonies, an appreciation of modern physics; and also, with biologist Joel E. Cohen, of Absolute Zero Gravity, a collection of science jokes, poems, and stories. About 75 pages taken from her blog were included as "a contribution"  to a collection of essays written by Frank Wilczek on various aspects of physics, Fantastic Realities.

Devine spoke at Wikimania in 2006.

Selected works

References

External links
 Now with Even More Funny Ha-Ha and Peculiar—Betsy's blog
 2003 interview with Frank Paynter
 2004 interview with Steve Rubel about her work for Feedster
 "Blogging in Boston" podcast with Tony Kahn, from "Morning Stories" show aired in 2004 (Link is to mp3 file)
 2005 Podcast conversation with Dave Winer (Link is to mp3 file of 40-minute conversation)

1946 births
Living people
American bloggers
American women journalists
American science writers
20th-century American journalists
21st-century American non-fiction writers
American women bloggers
American Wikimedians
20th-century American women
21st-century American women writers